"Little Ole Man (Uptight, Everything's Alright)" is a single by comedian Bill Cosby, released in 1967 from the entertainer's first musical comedy album, Silver Throat: Bill Cosby Sings. On the 1968 album 200 M.P.H., Cosby states that the song was dedicated to his grandfather.

Background
A comedic parody which Cosby narrated about "a little ole man" whom he discovers three times, first getting hit by a train, later being run over by elephants, and lastly having no recollection of either incident. The musical instrumental, chorus, and accompanying background vocals were a direct lift of the Stevie Wonder 1965 song "Uptight (Everything's Alright)", which had been a recent hit, and the authorship of "Little Ole Man" is credited solely to the authors of "Uptight". "Uptight" co-author Henry Cosby has no relation to Bill Cosby.

Chart history
The single became an unexpected hit for Cosby, reaching number four on the Billboard Hot 100.

References

Comedy songs
Bill Cosby songs
Warner Records singles
1967 songs
Songs written by Henry Cosby
Songs written by Sylvia Moy
Songs written by Stevie Wonder